The 2019 Zamfara State House of Assembly election was held on March 9, 2019, to elect members of the Zamfara State House of Assembly in Nigeria. All the 24 seats were up for election in the Zamfara State House of Assembly.

Results 
The result of the election is listed below.

 Lawan Liman from APC won Kaura Namoda North constituency
 Abubakar Kaura from APC won Kaura Namoda South constituency
 Kabiru Moyi from APC won Birnin Magaji constituency
 Yusif Moriki from APC won Zurmi East constituency
 Mannir Aliyu from APC won Zurmi West constituency
 Shehu Maiwurno from APC won Shinkafi constituency
 Aliyu Abubakar from APC won Tsafe East constituency
 Aminu Danjibua from APC won Tsafe West constituency
 Dalhatu Magami from APC won Gusau East constituency
 Sanusi Liman from APC won Gusau West constituency
 Ibrahim Hassan from APC won Bungudu East constituency
 Yakubu Bature from APC won Bungudu West constituency
 Ibrahim Habu from APC won Maru North constituency
 Haruna Abdullahi from APC won Maru South constituency
 Mustapha Gado from APC won Anka constituency
 Isah Abdulmumini from APC won Talata Mafara North constituency
 Aliyu Kagara from APC won Talata Mafara South constituency
 Mohammed Sani from APC won Bakura constituency
 Yahaya Shehu from APC won Maradun constituency
 Yahaya Abdullahi from APC won Maradun constituency
 Aliyu Gayari from APC won Gummi constituency
 Aminu Falale from APC won Gummi constituency
 Yahaya Jibrin from APC won Bukkuyum North constituency
 Tukur Dantawasa from APC won Bukkuyum South constituency

References 

Zamfara
2019 Zamfara State elections